Lu Yuanjiu (born 9 January 1920) is a Chinese physicist. He is a member of the Chinese Academy of Sciences and Chinese Academy of Engineering.

Biography
Lu was born in Chu County, Anhui, on 9 January 1920. His father was a teacher. He attended the Anhui Provincial No.8 Middle School and Jiangsu Provincial Nanjing High School. In November 1937, he was accepted to National Central University. That same year, the Imperial Japanese Army occupied north China, he escaped to Chongqing, where his university relocated. In 1945, he pursued advanced studies in the United States on government scholarships. He earned his doctor's degree at Massachusetts Institute of Technology under the direction of C. S. Dreber. After graduation, he became an associate research fellow at the institute. In January 1954, he joined the Laboratory of Ford Motor Company as an engineer.

Lu returned to China in 1956 and that same year became vice dean of the Institute of Automation, Chinese Academy of Sciences. In 1966, Mao Zedong launched the Cultural Revolution, he was deprived of all his work and was sent to the May Seventh Cadre Schools to do farm works. He was also brought to be persecuted. He moved to the 520th Research Institute of National Central University in January 1968, and was promoted to director of the 13th Research Institute in January 1978. In January 1984, he became a member of the Standing Committee of Science and Technology Committee of Ministry of Astronautics Industry.

Honours and awards
 1980 Member of the Chinese Academy of Sciences (CAS)
 1994 Member of the Chinese Academy of Engineering (CAE)
 1997 Science and Technology Achievement Award of the Ho Leung Ho Lee Foundation
 2021 July 1 Medal

References

External links
Lu Yuanjiu on the Ho Leung Ho Lee Foundation

1920 births
Living people
People from Chuzhou
Scientists from Anhui
National Central University alumni
Massachusetts Institute of Technology alumni
Members of the Chinese Academy of Sciences
Members of the Chinese Academy of Engineering
Chinese centenarians
Men centenarians
Chinese expatriates in the United States